Marcelo Melo and Bruno Soares won in the final 1–6, 6–3, [10–5], against Rohan Bopanna and Aisam-ul-Haq Qureshi.

Seeds

Draw

Draw

References
Main Draw

Doubles